Wayne Moses (born January 11, 1955, New Gulf, Texas) is an American football coach. He most recently served as running backs coach under head coach Robb Akey at Idaho.

Playing career

College playing career
Moses was a starter at the University of Washington, at cornerback. He was a member of the Huskies' 1978 Rose Bowl championship team.

Coaching career
Moses was one of Pete Carroll's first hires once he became head coach of the USC Trojans in 2001.

Between USC and coaching the UCLA Bruins, Moses was a running backs coach for the National Football League St. Louis Rams and also coached for Stanford and Pitt.

Inland Empire and East Bay are the areas of his recruitment responsibility.

He has coached many notable players and had successful seasons under his watch including
1984 at Rutgers: RB Albert Smith ran for 869 yards and 9 TD in a 7-3 season.
1986 at San Diego State: RB Chris Hardy ran for 947 yards and 12 TD in an 8-4 season.
1987 at San Diego State: RB Paul Hewitt ran for 1,001 yards and 18 TD.
1988 at San Diego State: RB Paul Hewitt ran for 1,055 yards and 10 TD.
1991 at UCLA: RB Kevin Williams ran for 1,141 yards and 8 TD.
1994 at UCLA: RB Sharmon Shah ran for 1,227 yards and 4 TD.
1995 at UCLA: RB Karim Abdul-Jabbar ran for 1,571 yards and 12 TD.

Personal life

Moses received his bachelor's degree in political science in 1977. Prior to his football career, he trained as an agent with the FBI at Quantico, Virginia. In San Dimas High School, he played both football and basketball.

He and his wife, Rosalind, have two adult daughters, Valerie and Kimberly.

See also
2009 UCLA Bruins football team

References

External links
https://web.archive.org/web/20081201132350/http://uclabruins.cstv.com/sports/m-footbl/mtt/moses_wayne00.html

1955 births
Living people
American football cornerbacks
Washington Huskies football players
Cal State Fullerton Titans football coaches
NC State Wolfpack football coaches
Bowling Green Falcons football coaches
Rutgers Scarlet Knights football coaches
San Diego State Aztecs football coaches
New Mexico Lobos football coaches
UCLA Bruins football coaches
California Golden Bears football coaches
Washington Huskies football coaches
USC Trojans football coaches
Stanford Cardinal football coaches
Pittsburgh Panthers football coaches
St. Louis Rams coaches
Idaho Vandals football coaches
Army Black Knights football coaches
Hawaii Rainbow Warriors football coaches
People from San Dimas, California